Uncharacterized LOC100132287 is a protein that in humans is encoded by the LOC100132287 gene.

References